A hobo is a migratory worker or homeless vagabond, often penniless.

Hobo may also refer to:

Arts and entertainment
 Hobo (book), an autobiographical book by Eddy Joe Cotton
 The Hobo, a 1917 film starring Oliver Hardy
 Hobo (band), a Yugoslav rock band
 The Hobos, a rock band from Latvia
 Hobo (Billy Bob Thornton album) (2005), the third album by Billy Bob Thornton
 Hobo (Charlie Winston album) (2009), the second album by Charlie Winston

People
 Percy Hobart (1885–1957), British major-general nicknamed "Hobo"
 Hobo Jim (born 1952), American folk singer-songwriter
 Hobo Johnson, American vocalist and frontman of Hobo Johnson and the LoveMakers

Military
 Hobo, callsign of VFA-94, a United States Navy fighter squadron 
 , a United States Navy patrol boat in commission from 1917 to 1919

Places 
 Hobo, Huila, a town and municipality in Colombia
 Hobo Station (Mie), a railway station in Yokkaichi, Mie Prefecture, Japan
 Hobo Branch, a stream in Missouri, United States

Other uses
 Hobo bag, a style of handbag
 Hobo (typeface), a sans serif typeface
 Hobo spider, Eratigena agrestis
 Hobo (The Littlest Hobo), title character of The Littlest Hobo
 Hendy Hobo, a British monoplane built in 1929 by the Hendy Aircraft Company
 Hobo Railroad, part of the Plymouth & Lincoln Railroad, in New Hampshire, United States

See also